Ifrah Wali, (29 November 1995) is a Pakistani alpine skier. She is the first winner of the Giant Slalom event at any South Asian Winter Games when she won at the inaugural games held in India.

Family and background
Wali belongs to Ghahkoch Valley in District Ghizar, Gilgit-Baltistan. Ifrah Wali, the progeny of the Gushpur family, the former royal family of the Punial Valley district Ghizer, excelled in the art of skiing mainly because she spent most of her childhood growing up in Ratto – a snow-capped area of Astore Valley where her father, Col. Amjad Wali, was posted in the army for nearly 11 years.

Wali completed her high school education from Army Public School, Gilgit and later graduated from Nust Business School in 2017.

Career
In 2011, Wali won the Giant Slalom event at the South Asian Games in India by beating her sister, Amina and an Indian competitor to the podium.

Ifrah Wali was selected  by the Pakistan Ski Federation (SFP) to train in Hintertux, Austria in FIS skiing camp for one month in Nov 2014. While training Ms. Wali met with an accident and broke the tibia and fibula of her right leg. SFP spoke person said regarding her injury “Ifrah met the tragedy while doing training as she slipped from a slope of Hintertux glacier [in Austria], from where she was airlifted to a hospital. She is being treated at the hospital where the doctors have advised her six-week bed rest.” 

Ms. Wali bagged one gold and two bronze in Karakoram International Ski Cup 2017, Pakistan's first international skiing championship. A total of 9 countries participated in this event with participants flying in from Turkey, Ukraine, Morocco, Afghanistan, India, Tajikistan, Slovakia, Sri Lanka, and Iran. 

In January 2017, Wali was named to Pakistan's 2017 Asian Winter Games team. Ifrah Wali, along with a contingent of 20 members represented Pakistan in the Asian Winter Games, Sapporo 2017. Ms. Wali received 23rd position in Giant Slalom and 25th position in Slalom. Pakistan at the 2017 Asian Winter Games

References

Living people
People from Gilgit-Baltistan
Pakistani female alpine skiers
South Asian Winter Games gold medalists for Pakistan
South Asian Winter Games medalists in alpine skiing
Year of birth missing (living people)
Alpine skiers at the 2017 Asian Winter Games